La mort de Cèsar or The Death of Julius Caesar is an 1806 painting by Vincenzo Camuccini depicting the assassination of Julius Caesar. 

The painting was originally commissioned in 1793 by Frederick Hervey, 4th Earl of Bristol, for whom he had already produced a copy of Raphael's Deposition. He completed a cartoon for the work in 1793 which was favourably received by art critics in Rome at the time. However, when he produced a first version of the painting in 1796, it was less well-received and so he destroyed it and started again from scratch, completing the current version in 1806. The Earl had died in 1803 and his heirs refused to pay for the work, so Camuccini instead sold it to Joachim Murat in 1807. After Murat's fall, it was acquired by Ferdinand II of the Two Sicilies and relocated to the Palazzo Reale in Naples. In 1864 it entered its present home, the National Museum of Capodimonte, in Naples.

References

Bibliography
 Francesco Landolfi, inserto Arte 7 in Dal testo alla storia dalla storia al testo, ed. Paravia, p. 1. 

1806 paintings
Italian paintings
Paintings of the death of Julius Caesar
Paintings in the collection of the Museo di Capodimonte